"I Got a Girl" is a song by German singer Lou Bega. The single was the successor to his greatest hit "Mambo No. 5" and released as the second single from his debut album, A Little Bit of Mambo (1999). In the song, Bega tells that "he's got girlfriends all over the world." It was certified gold in Sweden.

Track listing
 Maxi single
 "I Got a Girl" (radio version) – 3:04 
 "I Got a Girl" (original radio version) – 3:21 
 "I Got a Girl" (extended mix) – 5:02 
 "I Got a Girl" (club mix) – 5:31 
 "I Got a Girl" (instrumental version) – 3:04

Charts

Weekly charts

Year-end charts

Certifications

References

Lou Bega songs
1999 singles
1999 songs
RCA Records singles
Songs written by Lou Bega